Sofie Olsen (born 16 February 1995) is a Danish handball player for Nykøbing Falster Håndboldklub.

References 
 

Danish female handball players
1995 births
Living people
Sportspeople from Frederiksberg
Nykøbing Falster Håndboldklub players